David Gregory Huff (born August 22, 1984) is an American professional baseball pitcher who is a free agent. He previously played in Major League Baseball (MLB) for the Cleveland Indians, San Francisco Giants, New York Yankees, Los Angeles Dodgers, and Los Angeles Angels. Huff has also played for the LG Twins of the KBO League and for the Tokyo Yakult Swallows of Nippon Professional Baseball (NPB).

Early life
Huff attended Edison High School, the University of California, Irvine, Cypress College, and the University of California, Los Angeles.

In 2004 and 2005, he played collegiate summer baseball with the Chatham A's of the Cape Cod Baseball League.

Professional career
Huff was selected by the Cleveland Indians in the first round, with the 39th overall selection, of the 2006 MLB draft.

Minor leagues
Since 2006, Huff has played minor league baseball with the Mahoning Valley Scrappers, Kinston Indians, Akron Aeros, Buffalo Bisons, and Columbus Clippers.

In 11 games with the Akron Aeros in 2008, Huff had a career-best ERA of 1.92.   He then pitched 80 innings for the Bisons in 2008 and put up a 3.01 ERA.  He was named the Indians' 2008 Minor League Player of the Year (receiving the "Lou Boudreau Award").

Huff pitched for the AAA Columbus Clippers in 2009 until his call-up on May 16. He had a 5–1 record with a 4.35 ERA with the Clippers.

Cleveland Indians
Huff made his MLB debut with a start against the Tampa Bay Rays on May 17, 2009. He allowed seven runs in only 3.2 innings to pick up the loss. He recorded his first MLB win on June 7 when he allowed three runs in five innings against the Chicago White Sox. In 23 starts in 2009 he finished 11-8 with a 5.61 ERA.

On May 29, 2010, Huff was hit in the head by a comeback line drive off the bat of Alex Rodriguez. Huff was carried off the field by a medical cart several minutes later. Huff did not sustain a concussion, and returned to his regular baseball activities within 48 hours of the incident.

Huff split his time with the Indians and the minor league affiliates during his four-year tenure with the team. Huff was designated for assignment by the Indians organization on May 24, 2013. Overall, Huff went 18–26 with a 5.40 ERA during his career with the Cleveland Indians.

New York Yankees
Huff was claimed off waivers by the Yankees on May 26, 2013 and made his Yankees debut the same day he was acquired, recording a strikeout, two walks, and allowing a run in one inning of relief pitched against the Tampa Bay Rays. He was designated for assignment on May 28, 2013 after Joba Chamberlain was activated from the disabled list. Not wanting to join a third organization, and trusting Yankees' pitching coach Larry Rothschild, Huff accepted a minor league assignment to the Scranton/Wilkes-Barre RailRiders of the Class AAA International League, after receiving instruction from Rothschild on how to improve his delivery. In Scranton, he continued his work with Gil Patterson.

Huff was re-added to the Yankees' 25-man major league roster and recalled from the minors on August 15, 2013.  On August 22, Huff got his first win as a Yankee after pitching five innings of one-hit relief against the Toronto Blue Jays. The Yankees primarily used Huff in the long relief role, but gave him a start in place of Phil Hughes on September 7. He was 3-1 with a 4.67 ERA in 11 appearances (2 starts).

San Francisco Giants
On January 24, 2014, the Yankees traded Huff to the San Francisco Giants for cash considerations. He was designated for assignment on June 6 after posting a disappointing 6.30 ERA with 11 strikeouts and six walks in 20 innings.

New York Yankees (second stint)
On June 11, 2014, Huff was traded back to the Yankees for cash considerations. He was 3-1 with a 1.85 ERA in 30 games and became a free agent on December 2, 2014 after he was non-tendered by the Yankees.

Los Angeles Dodgers
The Los Angeles Dodgers signed him to a minor league contract in January 2015 and invited him to spring training. He was assigned to the AAA Oklahoma City Dodgers. After one three inning appearance in the minors, the Dodgers purchased his contract and called him up to the Majors to start the April 14 game against the Mariners. He allowed four runs in four innings and was designated for assignment after the game. After returning to Oklahoma City, he was again recalled by the Dodgers on June 1. He was designated for assignment again on June 2 after appearing in relief in two games. He returned to the minors and appeared in 23 games for Oklahoma City, only four of which were starts. He was 5–2 with a 2.20 ERA.

Huff was selected to be a member of the United States national baseball team for the 2015 Pan-American Games.

Kansas City Royals
On January 9, 2016, Huff agreed to a minor league deal with the Kansas City Royals. He would earn $1.1 million if he made the Major League roster. He opted out of his contract on May 15, making him a free agent.

Los Angeles Angels
On May 18, 2016, Huff signed a minor league deal with the Los Angeles Angels. The Angels promoted Huff to the MLB to start on June 7.

LG Twins
On July 8, 2016, Huff signed a deal with the LG Twins of the KBO League.

Tokyo Yakult Swallows
On December 20, 2017, Huff signed a one-year, $1.3 million contract with the Tokyo Yakult Swallows of Nippon Professional Baseball (NPB).

On December 2, 2019, he become free agent.

Arizona Diamondbacks
On January 20, 2020, Huff signed a minor league deal with the Arizona Diamondbacks. Huff was released by the Diamondbacks organization on May 28, 2020.

Sugar Land Lightning Sloths
In July 2020, Huff signed on to play for the Sugar Land Lightning Sloths of the Constellation Energy League (a makeshift 4-team independent league created as a result of the COVID-19 pandemic) for the 2020 season.

Seattle Mariners
On May 13, 2021, Huff signed a minor league contract with the Seattle Mariners organization. Huff pitched to a 5.25 ERA in 14 appearances, 9 starts for the Triple-A Tacoma Rainiers before he was released on August 12, 2021.

Diablos Rojos del México
On April 8, 2022, Huff signed with the Diablos Rojos del México of the Mexican League. Huff made 21 appearances (11 starts) for México in 2022, recording a 6-1 record and 4.86 ERA with 53 strikeouts in 74.0 innings pitched.

Guerreros de Oaxaca
On December 29, 2022, Huff was loaned to the Guerreros de Oaxaca of the Mexican League. Huff was released by Oaxaca on January 18, 2023, after the team signed Eric Filia.

References

External links

1984 births
Living people
Akron Aeros players
American expatriate baseball players in Japan
American expatriate baseball players in Mexico
American expatriate baseball players in South Korea
Baseball players at the 2015 Pan American Games
Baseball players from San Diego
Buffalo Bisons (minor league) players
Chatham Anglers players
Cleveland Indians players
Columbus Clippers players
Cypress Chargers baseball players
Diablos Rojos del México players
Fresno Grizzlies players
KBO League pitchers
Kinston Indians players
LG Twins players
Los Angeles Angels players
Los Angeles Dodgers players
Mahoning Valley Scrappers players
Major League Baseball pitchers
New York Yankees players
Nippon Professional Baseball pitchers
Oklahoma City Dodgers players
Omaha Storm Chasers players
Pan American Games medalists in baseball
Pan American Games silver medalists for the United States
Salt Lake Bees players
San Francisco Giants players
Scranton/Wilkes-Barre RailRiders players
Tacoma Rainiers players
Tokyo Yakult Swallows players
UC Irvine Anteaters baseball players
UCLA Bruins baseball players
United States national baseball team players
Medalists at the 2015 Pan American Games